Taractrocera fusca is a butterfly of the family Hesperiidae. It is only known from the Western Highlands in New Guinea.

External links
Phylogeny and biogeography of the genus Taractrocera Butler, 1870 (Lepidoptera: Hesperiidae), an example of Southeast Asian-Australian interchange

Taractrocerini
Butterflies described in 2004